, or JAMA, is a trade association with its headquarters in Tokyo, Japan. It was founded in April 1967 and serves as a platform for the automakers of Japan to share technological developments and management practices.  There are currently 14 member companies, manufacturing not only cars, but trucks and motorcycles as well. The organization also deals with the manufacturing and distribution of vehicle parts around the world. Together, the companies of JAMA hold a vast share of the markets in the United States, Europe, and many developing countries. JAMA also has offices located in Beijing, Singapore, Washington, D.C. (US Office), Toronto (Canadian Office) and Brussels, Belgium (Europe Office).

Members of JAMA 
Toyota Motor Corporation
Nissan Motors (formerly Datsun)
Honda Motor Co., Ltd.
Mitsubishi Motors Corporation (Member of the Mitsubishi Group)
Suzuki Motor Corporation
Mazda Motor Corporation 
Daihatsu Motor Co., Ltd. (Major shareholder: Toyota – 51.2%, thus a member of the Toyota Group)
Hino Motors (Member of the Toyota Group)
Subaru (Automotive division of Fuji Heavy Industries — Major shareholder: Toyota – 8.7%, thus a member of the Toyota Group)
Isuzu Motor Co., Ltd. (Major shareholders: ITOCHU, Mitsubishi Corporation, Toyota – 5.9%, thus a member of the Toyota Group)
UD, or Nissan Diesel Motor Company (Major shareholder: Volvo Group – 13%)
Mitsubishi Fuso Truck and Bus Corporation (Major shareholders: Daimler AG – 89.29%, Mitsubishi Group – 10.71%)
Kawasaki Heavy Industries
Yamaha Motor Company

Other brands of member companies 

The "Big Three" of Japan (Toyota, Nissan, and Honda), each have luxury divisions: Honda's Acura (created in 1986), Nissan's Infiniti, and Toyota's Lexus (both created in 1989). Other than limited sales of the Infiniti Q45 these brands were only available outside Japan until 2005, when Lexus was introduced to the Japanese domestic market ("JDM"). Acura and Infiniti are also planned to be introduced into the Japanese domestic market by 2008. Toyota also began marketing some of its small domestic market cars in the United States under the Scion marque in 2003.

In Japan, there are also numerous small car manufacturers, coachbuilders, and tuning companies. Companies such as Mitsuoka, Spoon Sports, and HKS build  production vehicles, sports cars, or one-off concepts in much smaller quantities than the major carmakers, therefore they are not included in JAMA.

See also 
Chamber of commerce
List of employer associations
Japanese automobile industry

References

External links
 JAMA Japanese website
 JAMA U.S. website
 JAMA English language website
 JAMA Canada

Motor trade associations
Trade associations based in Japan
Automotive industry in Japan
Manufacturing in Japan
Professional associations based in Japan
Employers' organizations in Japan
Business organizations based in Japan
Advocacy groups in Japan